National Commercial Bank may refer to:
 NCB Financial Group, a Caribbean banking group headquartered in Jamaica
 National Commercial Bank (China), a defunct commercial bank that was based in Hong Kong
 National Commercial Bank Mauritius, a state-owned commercial bank in Mauritius
 National Commercial Bank (Saudi Arabia)
 National Commercial Bank of Scotland, a defunct Scottish commercial bank that was merged into the Royal Bank of Scotland
 Zambia National Commercial Bank, a commercial bank in Zambia